Marmaduke Wyvill may refer to:

Marmaduke Wyvill (MP for Ripon) (died 1558), MP for Ripon
 Sir Marmaduke Wyvill, 1st Baronet	(c.1542–1617),  Member of Parliament (MP) for Richmond 1584–1585 and 1597–1598
 Sir Marmaduke Wyvill, 5th Baronet	(c.1666–1722),  MP for Richmond 1695–1698
 Sir Marmaduke Wyvill, 6th Baronet	(c.1692–1754),  MP for Richmond 1727–1728
 Marmaduke Wyvill (1791–1872), Whig MP for York 1820–1826
 Marmaduke Wyvill (chess player) (1815–1896), English chess master and Liberal MP for Richmond 1847–1865 and 1866–1868
 Marmaduke D'Arcy Wyvill (1849–1918), Conservative MP for Otley 1895–1900

See also
 Marmaduke (name)
 Wyvill (surname)